Alejandro Corichi is a theoretical physicist working at the Quantum Gravity group of the National Autonomous University of Mexico (UNAM). He obtained his bachelor's degree at UNAM (1991) and his PhD  at Pennsylvania State University (1997). 
His field of study is General Relativity and Quantum Gravity, where
he has contributed to the understanding of classical aspects of black holes, to the non-commutativity and black holes within the approach known as Loop quantum gravity and to loop quantum cosmology.

External links
Profile and research at the UNAM site.
Abstract of an article on Loop Quantization of Maxwell Theory.

Living people
Year of birth missing (living people)
21st-century Mexican physicists
Loop quantum gravity researchers
National Autonomous University of Mexico alumni
Academic staff of the National Autonomous University of Mexico
Mexican astronomers
Eberly College of Science alumni